Cornwall Capital is a New York City-based private financial investment corporation. It was founded in 2003 by Jamie Mai, President and Chief Investment Officer, under the guidance of his father, Vincent Mai, who ran the private equity firm AEA Investors, one of the oldest leveraged buyout firms in the United States. It was profiled in the book The Big Short by Michael Lewis as one of a handful of investors in the world that correctly foresaw and profited from the subprime mortgage crisis of 2007. In addition, James Mai's investment strategy was portrayed by Jack D. Schwager in the book Hedge Fund Market Wizards (2012), an inside analysis of the world's greatest hedge fund experts and the strategies that they implement. They were featured in the film adaptation of The Big Short, fictionalized with the names Charlie Geller, Jamie Shipley and Ben Rickert (played by John Magaro, Finn Wittrock and Brad Pitt). This has resulted in them being widely known for their investments running up to the financial crash in 2007–08.

History

The firm started as a family office to diversify the capital of James Mai's father. Soon after Cornwall's inception, Charlie Ledley, a former private equity colleague, joined the firm. In 2005, Ben Hockett joined as head trader, bringing extensive knowledge of capital markets, derivatives, and fixed income trading. Charlie Ledley left Cornwall in 2009 to join a large Boston-based hedge fund. Ben Hockett has remained at the firm as the head trader and chief risk officer. Other senior members include partners JC de Swaan and Ian Haft.

Cornwall seeks highly asymmetric investments, in which the upside potential significantly exceeds the downside risk, across a broad spectrum of strategies ranging from trades that seek to benefit from market inefficiencies to thematic fundamental trades. The firm has produced an average annual compounded net return of 40 percent (52 percent gross).

Cornwall Capital was one of a few investors who saw and shorted the subprime mortgage crisis market prior to the 2007 collapse; according to Michael Lewis, they were perhaps one out of 20 in the world who did so. This particular trade generated 80 times the initial premium (investment). The founders of Cornwall Capital started a hedge fund in their garage with $110,000 and built it into $120 million when the market crashed.

James Mai decided to open up the fund to a few like-minded investors with whom he could be transparent and share ideas, starting in May 2011.

Cornwall Capital was reported to have become in 2013 the largest shareholder of chemicals manufacturer American Pacific Corporation, a NASDAQ listed US company, with close to 15% of the outstanding stock. American Pacific Corporation agreed to nominate Ian Haft for election to its board of directors in order to resolve a potential proxy contest. The company was sold to H.I.G. Capital in January 2014.

Notes

External links
Cornwall Capital, official website.
All geek to them: A handful of outsiders come out of the crisis in credit, The Economist, Mar 18th 2010.

Financial services companies established in 2003
Investment companies based in New York City
American companies established in 2003
2003 establishments in New York City
2003 establishments in the United States
Companies established in 2003